

Champions

Major League Baseball
World Series: St. Louis Cardinals over St. Louis Browns (4–2), in the "Streetcar Series"
All-Star Game, July 11 at Forbes Field: National League, 7–1

Other champions
Amateur World Series: Venezuela
Negro League World Series: Homestead Grays over Birmingham Black Barons (4–1)
Negro League Baseball All-Star Game: West, 7–4
All-American Girls Professional Baseball League: Milwaukee Chicks over Kenosha Comets

Awards and honors
Baseball Hall of Fame
Kenesaw Mountain Landis
Most Valuable Player
Hal Newhouser (AL) – pitcher, Detroit Tigers
Marty Marion (NL) – shortstop, St. Louis Cardinals
The Sporting News Player of the Year Award
Marty Marion (NL) – St. Louis Cardinals
The Sporting News Most Valuable Player Award
Bobby Doerr (AL) – Second base, Boston Red Sox
Marty Marion (NL) – Shortstop, St. Louis Cardinals
The Sporting News Pitcher of the Year Award
Hal Newhouser (AL) – Detroit Tigers
Bill Voiselle (NL) – New York Giants
The Sporting News Manager of the Year Award
Luke Sewell (AL) – St. Louis Browns

MLB statistical leaders

Major league baseball final standings

American League final standings

National League final standings

Negro league baseball final standings

Negro American League final standings

Negro National League final standings

Events

January–March
March 1 – The St. Louis Browns trade catcher Rick Ferrell to the Washington Senators in exchange for catcher Tony Giuliani. However, Guiliani, who'd played for St. Louis during the 1936 and 1937 seasons, refuses to report. Washington completes the trade by sending outfielder Gene Moore to St. Louis in Guiliani's place.

April–June
April 27 – At Braves Field, Jim Tobin of the Boston Braves no-hits the Brooklyn Dodgers 2–0 and helps his own cause by homering off Fritz Ostermueller in the eighth inning. Tobin becomes the second no-hit pitcher to hit a home run in the same game, joining Wes Ferrell almost a full 13 years earlier, on April 29, .
May 1 – George Myatt of the Washington Senators goes 6-for-6 as the Nats beat the Red Sox, 11–4.
May 4 – The St. Louis Browns announce that they are dropping their segregation policy restricting Negro fans to the bleachers.
May 10 – Mel Harder becomes the 50th pitcher in major league history to win 200 games as the Cleveland Indians defeat the Boston Red Sox 5-4. 
May 15 – At Crosley Field, Clyde Shoun of the Cincinnati Reds no-hits the Boston Braves 1–0. The only baserunner he allows is a third-inning walk to his mound opponent, Jim Tobin, himself a no-hit pitcher only 18 days earlier.
June 1 – The Cincinnati Reds sell the contract of Fritz Ostermueller to the Pittsburgh Pirates.
June 6:
All games are cancelled due to D-Day.
The Brooklyn Dodgers acquire Eddie Stanky from the chicago Cubs in exchange for pitcher Bob Chipman. 
June 10 – 15-year-old pitcher Joe Nuxhall of the Cincinnati Reds makes his major league debut. He is the youngest player ever to appear in a Major League game.

July–September
July 11 – At Forbes Field, home of the Pittsburgh Pirates, the National League defeats the American League, 7–1, in the All-Star Game.
August 10 – Red Barrett of the Boston Braves throws a shutout with just 58 pitches – a record for fewest pitches in a nine-inning game. The game lasted 75 minutes. Barrett gave up only two hits. He did not strikeout or walk any batters, and threw an average of only 2 pitches per batter. In 1944, 96 of the Reds games was completed in under two hours. 
September 30 – Detroit Tigers pitcher Hal Newhouser wins his 29th game, defeating the Washington Senators, 7–3.

October–December
October 9 – The St. Louis Cardinals defeated the St. Louis Browns, 3–1, in Game 6 of the World Series to win their fifth World Series, four games to two. The Browns are the last of the original eight members of the American League to win the pennant.  It would be their only World Series appearance before relocating to Baltimore ten years later. This only marked only the third time in World Series history in which both teams had the same home field, Sportsman's Park, with the other two being in 1921 and 1922 at the Polo Grounds. The Series was also known as the "Streetcar Series", or the "St. Louis Showdown".
November 28 – Detroit Tigers pitcher Hal Newhouser, who posted a 29–9 record with 187 strikeouts and a 2.22 ERA, is named the American League Most Valuable Player, gathering four more votes than pitching teammate Dizzy Trout (27–14, 144, 2.12).
December 2 – Japan, where baseball has been banned as an undesirable enemy influence, mourns the death of Eiji Sawamura. The Japanese pitcher, who is killed in action in the Pacific, became a national hero by striking out Babe Ruth in an exhibition game.

Births

January
January 3 – Dick Colpaert
January 4 – Tito Fuentes
January 4 – Charlie Manuel
January 5 – Tom Kelley
January 5 – Charlie Vinson
January 7 – Dick Calmus
January 9 – Dick Thoenen
January 10 – Chuck Dobson
January 11 – Frank Baker
January 11 – Jim McAndrew
January 13 – Larry Jaster
January 16 – Gene Stone
January 17 – Denny Doyle
January 18 – Carl Morton
January 19 – Chet Trail
January 20 – Carl Taylor
January 23 – Paul Ratliff
January 25 – Gary Holman

February
February 1 – Paul Blair
February 1 – Hal King
February 3 – Wayne Comer
February 3 – Celerino Sánchez
February 9 – Jim Campanis
February 9 – Randy Schwartz
February 11 – Ollie Brown
February 13 – Sal Bando
February 16 – Glenn Vaughan
February 17 – Dick Bosman
February 18 – Syd O'Brien
February 19 – Chris Zachary
February 21 – Tokuji Nagaike
February 23 – Don Shaw
February 25 – Stump Merrill
February 26 – Don Secrist
February 29 – Steve Mingori

March
March 1 – Vern Fuller
March 1 – Ron Klimkowski
March 9 – Ed Acosta
March 10 – John Briggs
March 10 – Joe Campbell
March 12 – Joe Moock
March 14 – John Miller
March 15 – Wayne Granger
March 15 – Dave Watkins
March 16 – Rick Renick
March 17 – Cito Gaston
March 20 – Steve Blateric
March 20 – Bob Taylor
March 21 – Manny Sanguillén
March 22 – Matt Galante
March 23 – George Scott
March 25 – Jim Britton
March 29 – Denny McLain

April
April 1 – Rusty Staub
April 3 – Gomer Hodge
April 7 – Bill Stoneman
April 9 – Joe Brinkman
April 12 – Terry Harmon
April 14 – Frank Bertaina
April 16 – Bob Montgomery
April 24 – Bill Singer
April 25 – Drew Baur
April 25 – Joe Hague
April 25 – Ken Tatum
April 26 – Leon McFadden

May
May 6 – Masanori Murakami
May 7 – Billy Murphy
May 14 – Jim Driscoll
May 19 – Stan Swanson
May 22 – Frank Coggins
May 22 – Bob Schaefer
May 27 – Jim Holt

June
June 6 – Bud Harrelson
June 7 – Roger Nelson
June 7 – Frank Reberger
June 8 – Mark Belanger
June 20 – Dave Nelson
June 28 – Hal Breeden
June 30 – Ron Swoboda

July
July 4 – Fred Rico
July 9 – Hal Haydel
July 9 – Sonny Jackson
July 12 – Tom Tischinski
July 13 – Buzz Stephen
July 14 – Billy McCool
July 18 – Rudy May
July 22 – Sparky Lyle
July 25 – Buddy Bradford
July 25 – Fred Scherman
July 30 – Pat Kelly
July 30 – Doug Rader
July 31 – Frank Brosseau

August
August 2 – Chris Coletta
August 4 – Rich Nye
August 15 – Mike Compton
August 15 – John Matias
August 18 – Mike Ferraro
August 20 – Graig Nettles
August 25 – Dick Smith
August 27 – Johnny Hairston
August 30 – Tug McGraw

September
September 7 – Barry Lersch
September 10 – Jim Hibbs
September 11 – John McSherry
September 11 – Dave Roberts
September 16 – Chuck Brinkman
September 19 – Russ Nagelson
September 20 – Ed Phillips
September 22 – Jim Fairey
September 23 – Oscar Zamora
September 27 – Gene Rounsaville
September 27 – Gary Sutherland

October
October 4 – Tony La Russa
October 8 – Ed Kirkpatrick
October 9 – Freddie Patek
October 11 – Mike Fiore
October 14 – Rich Robertson
October 15 – Dick Such
October 23 – Jim Rittwage
October 24 – Johnny Jeter
October 25 – Skip Guinn
October 29 – Jim Bibby
October 29 – Gary Neibauer

November
November 7 – Joe Niekro
November 8 – Ed Kranepool
November 9 – Al Severinsen
November 17 – Tom Seaver
November 27 – Ron Tompkins

December
December 1 – Jim Ray
December 4 – Lee Bales
December 6 – Tony Horton
December 9 – Del Unser
December 10 – Steve Renko
December 15 – Stan Bahnsen
December 15 – Jim Leyland
December 18 – Steve Hovley
December 19 – Rob Gardner
December 20 – Don Mason
December 22 – Steve Carlton
December 23 – Ray Lamb
December 23 – Vic LaRose
December 30 – José Morales
December 30 – Bob Schroder

Deaths

January
January   7 – George Mullin, 63, pitcher who won 228 games including a no-hitter, mainly with the Tigers, having five 20-win seasons.
January   8 – Harry Daubert, 51, pinch-hitter for the 1915 Pittsburgh Pirates.
January 13 – Kid Elberfeld, 68, shortstop for six clubs in 11 seasons between 1898 and 1914, who also managed the New York Highlanders of the American League in the 1908 season.
January 30 – Ed Clough, 37, outfielder and pitcher who played from 1924 through 1926 with the St. Louis Cardinals.

February
February   4 – Dixie Davis, 53, pitcher who played for the Cincinnati Reds, Chicago White Sox, Philadelphia Phillies and St. Louis Browns during ten seasons spanning 1910–1926.
February 18 – Hub Pernoll, 55, pitcher for the Detroit Tigers in the 1910 and 1912 seasons.
February 20 – Harry Wilhelm, 69, pitcher for the 1899 Louisville Colonels.
February 21 – Jack Enzenroth, 58, catcher who played from 1914 to 1915 with the St. Louis Browns and the Kansas City Packers.
February 23 – Al Bauer, 84, pitcher who played with the Columbus Buckeyes in 1884 and for the St. Louis Maroons in 1886.
February 25 – Bill Knowlton, 45, pitcher who played for the Philadelphia Athletics during the 1920 season.

March
March 10 – Dan Howley, 58, player, coach and manager who caught in 1913 for the Philadelphia Phillies, later served as a coach for the Detroit Tigers in 1919 and 1921–1922, then managed the St. Louis Browns from 1927–1929 and the Cincinnati Reds from 1930–1932.
March 11 – Bill Duzen, 74, pitcher who played in 1890 for the Buffalo Bisons of the Players' League.
March 17 – Rube Kroh, 57, pitcher who played for the Boston Americans, Chicago Cubs and Boston Braves during six seasons spanning 1906–1912, being also credited as the player who got the ball into the hands of Johnny Evers in the famous Merkle's Boner game.
March 18 – Frank Motz, 74, first baseman who played with the Philadelphia Phillies in 1890 and the Cincinnati Reds from 1893 to 1894.
March 19  – Joe Dunn, 59, catcher for the Brooklyn Superbas during the 1908 and 1909 baseball seasons, who later became a distinguished manager in the minor leagues, winning championship titles in 1919, 1920 and 1930.
March 19 – John Kelly, 65, ot. Louis Cardinals in the 1907 season.
March 22 – Claude Hendrix, 54, pitcher who played from 1911 through 1920 for the Pittsburgh Pirates, Chicago Chi-Feds, Chicago Whales and Chicago Cubs.
March 24 – Bob Glenalvin, 77, second baseman for the Chicago Colts of the National League in 1890 and 1893.
March 26 – Neil Stynes, 75, catcher who played in two games for the 1890 Cleveland Infants of the short-lived Players' League.

April
April   2 – Bob Brush, 69, backup catcher who played for the 1907 Boston Doves of the National League.
April 11 – Jack Dunleavy, 64, outfielder and pitcher who played from through 1905 for the St. Louis Cardinals
April 16 – Pop Foster, 66, outfielder who spent 18 years in baseball, four of them in the Major Leagues with the New York Giants, Washington Senators and Chicago White Sox from 1898 to 1901.
April 20 – Elmer Gedeon, 27, outfielder for the 1939 Washington Senators, whose name is linked forever to that of Harry O'Neill as the only two major leaguers that were killed during World War II.
April 25 – Tony Mullane, 85, first pitcher to throw left-handed and right-handed in a same game, who won 284 games a posted 3.05 ERA in 13 seasons, including five 30-win seasons and the first no-hitter in American Association history in 1882, while leading the league in shutouts twice and strikeouts once, and compiling 264 complete with the Cincinnati Reds, which remains a club record.

May
May   2 – Art Thomason, 55, backup outfielder for the Cleveland Naps in its 1910 season.
May   9 – Snake Deal, 65, first baseman who played with the Cincinnati Reds in 1906.
May 12 – John Pappalau, 69, pitcher for the Cleveland Spiders in 1897.
May 14 – Billy Hart, 77, pitcher who played for the 1890 St.Louis Browns of the American Association.
May 18 – Bob Clark, 46, pitcher who played from 1920 to 1921 for the Cleveland Indians.
May 18 – Tim Shinnick, 76, second baseman who played from 1890 to 1891 for the Louisville Colonels of the American Association.
May 31 – John McKelvey, 96, outfielder who played in 1875 for the New Haven Elm Citys of the National Association of Professional Base Ball Players.

June
June   5 – Phil Knell, 79, pitcher for the Cleveland Spiders, Columbus Solons, Louisville Colonels, Philadelphia Athletics, Pittsburgh Alleghenys/Pirates and Washington Senators in a span of six years from 1888–1995, who had two 20-win seasons, and led three different leagues for the most hitters hit by pitches from 1890 to 1892.
June 21 – Harry Swacina, 62, first baseman who played for the Pittsburgh Pirates and Baltimore Terrapins in parts of four seasons from  1907–1915.
June 28 – Dan Stearns, 82, first baseman for six teams in seven seasons spanning 1880–1889, who is better known as the man that produced the final out in Tony Mullane's no-hitter in 1882, he first no-no in American Association history.

July
July   3 – Pete McBride, 68, pitcher for the 1898 Cleveland Spiders and the 1989 St. Louis Perfectos.
July   3 – Charlie Reynolds, 79, catcher who played for the Kansas City Cowboys and the Brooklyn Bridegrooms during the 1889 season.
July   5 – Claude Rothgeb, 64, right fielder for the 1904 Washington Senators of the American League, who also enjoyed a distinguished career as a football coach at Colorado College and Rice University, and as a baseball coach at Texas A&M.
July 10 – Tom Walker, 62, pitcher who played with the Philadelphia Athletics in the 1902 season and for the Cincinnati Reds from 1904 to 1905.
July 16 – Hal Irelan, 53, second baseman for the Philadelphia Phillies in the 1914 season.
July 22 – Irv Waldron, 68, catcher who played for the Milwaukee Brewers and Washington Senators of the American League in 1901.

August
August   2 – Arthur Hauger, 50, fourth outfielder for the 1912 Cleveland Naps, who also spent more than 30 years in baseball as a player, coach and manager in the Minor Leagues.
August   4 – Camp Skinner, 47, backup outfielder who played in 1922 for the first-place New York Yankees and the next year played for the last-place Boston Red Sox.
August 16 – Tom Sullivan, 37, catcher who played briefly with the Cincinnati Reds in 1925.
August 21 – Bob Gilks, 80, infielder/outfielder and pitcher for the Cleveland Blues/Spiders and Baltimore Orioles in five seasons from 1887–1893, who hit .239 in 339 games and posted a 9–9 pitching record with a 3.98 ERA, while leading the American Association in saves in the 1888 season.
August 21 – Lew Post, 69, outfielder for the 1902 Detroit Tigers.
August 29 – Willie McGill, 70, who made his major league debut in the Players' League in 1890 as a 16-year rookie, and the following year won 21 games in the last season that the American Association existed, pitching the rest of his career in the National League primarily during a lively ball era, ending with a career win–loss record of 72–74 for six teams before retiring at age 22.
August 30 – Bill Duggleby, 70, pitcher for three clubs during eight seasons from 1898–1907, who had a 20-win season and posted a career record of 93–102 with a 3.18 ERA in 241 pitching appearances, including 159 complete games.

September
September   4 – Jack Gleason, 90, third baseman for five teams in a span of six seasons from 1877–1886, and a member of the 1884 Union Association Champions St. Louis Maroons.
September   9 – Frank Shugart, 77, shortstop for six teams in eight seasons spanning 1890–1901, who was blacklisted from baseball after the 1901 season because of an altercation in which he punched an umpire in the face, and eventually had to resume his career in the Minor Leagues.
September   9 – Orlin Collier, 37, pitcher for the Detroit Tigers in the 1931 season.
September 16 – Farmer Steelman, 69, catcher who played from 1899 through 1902 for the Louisville Colonels, Brooklyn Superbas and Philadelphia Athletics.

October
October   2 – Dick Robertson, 53, pitcher who played for the Cincinnati Reds, Brooklyn Robins and Washington Senators in parts of three seasons spanning 1913–1919.
October   9 – Joe DeBerry, 47, who played for the St. Louis Browns of the American League in 1920 and 1921.
October 10 – Louis Leroy, 65, pitcher for the New York Highlanders and the Boston Red Sox in a span of three seasons from 1905–1910.
October 14 – Topsy Hartsel, 70, outfielder for four teams in 14 seasons, who led the American League in stolen bases and runs scored in 1902, and was a member of the Philadelphia Athletics teams who clinched the league's pennant in 1902 and 1905, and the World Series in 1910 and 1911.
October 17 – Jack Powell, 70, pitcher who won 245 games, primarily for the St. Louis Browns and the St. Louis Cardinals.
October 22 – Jim Brown, 47, fourth outfielder who played for the St. Louis Cardinals in the 1915 season and the Philadelphia Athletics in 1916.
October 24 – Pinky Swander, 64, right fielder who played from 1903 to 1904 for the St. Louis Browns.
October 29 – Scott Hardesty, 74, shortstop for the 1899 New York Giants.

November
November   2 – Ed Brandt, 39, pitcher who played from 1928 through 1938 for the Boston Braves, Brooklyn Dodgers and Pittsburgh Pirates.
November   2 – Bert Conn, 65, pitcher and second baseman for the Philadelphia Phillies in the 1898 and 1901 seasons.
November 19 – Frank Brill, 80, pitcher and outfielder for the 1884 Detroit Wolverines. 
November 25 – Kenesaw Mountain Landis, 78, commissioner of baseball since that office's creation in 1920, who established the position's authority in overseeing cleanup of corruption in wake of the Black Sox scandal, banishing eight players from the sport for life for involvement in throwing the 1919 World Series. Previously, as federal judge had presided over 1914 case in which the Federal League challenged the Major Leagues under antitrust law, being also a strong advocate of the independence of Minor League Baseball from control of MLB.
November 28 – Elmer Miller, 54, outfielder who played for the St. Louis Cardinals, New York Yankees and Boston Red Sox in part of nine seasons between 1912 and 1922.

December
December 2 – Eiji Sawamura, 27, Hall of Fame Japanese pitcher who played for the Tokyo Kyojin.
December 4 – Roger Bresnahan, 65, Hall of Fame catcher and leadoff hitter who starred for the New York Giants from 1902 to 1908, known as the first major leaguer to wear shin guards, while remaining the only catcher to steal over 200 bases in a Major League career.
December 9 – Swat McCabe, 63, shortstop who played from 1909 to 1910 for the Cincinnati Reds.
December 12 – Ed Pinnance, 65, Canadian pitcher who played with the Philadelphia Athletics in its 1903 season.
December 13 – Lloyd Christenbury, 51, infield/outfield utility who played four seasons with the Boston Braves from 1919 to 1922.
December 13 – Welcome Gaston, 69, pitcher who played for the Brooklyn's Bridegrooms and Superbas clubs in parts of the 1898 and 1899 seasons.
December 14 – Jouett Meekin, 77, who was reportedly as one of the three hardest-throwing pitchers of the 1890s, along with Cy Young and Amos Rusie, while playing from 1891 to 1900 with five different National League teams, most prominently for the New York Giants from 1894–1899, winning 33 games for the team in 1894 en route to a postseason championship.
December 15 – Jim Chatterton, 80, infield/outfield utility and pitcher who played for the Kansas City Cowboys of the Union Association in 1884.
December 20 – Elmer Zacher, 64, outfielder who played for the New York Giants and St. Louis Cardinals during the 1910 season. 
December 28 – Bill Bowman, 77, backup catcher for the Chicago Colts in 1891.
December 31 – Bill Chappelle, 63, pitcher who played for the Boston Doves, Cincinnati Reds and Brooklyn Tip-Tops in a span of three seasons from 1908–1914.

References

External links

Baseball Reference – 1944 MLB Season Summary  
Baseball Reference – MLB Players born in 1944
Baseball Reference – MLB Players died in 1944